This is a list of the winners of, and nominees for, the Kids' Choice Award for Favorite Animated Movie, given at the Nickelodeon Kids' Choice Awards. It was first awarded in 2006.

Winners and nominees
The winners are listed in bold.

See also
Academy Award for Best Animated Feature

Notes
≈ indicates an Academy Award for Best Animated Feature winner
≠ indicates an Academy Award for Best Animated Feature nominee

References

Favorite Animated Movie
Awards for best animated feature film
Awards established in 2006